This is a list of St. George Illawarra Dragons players who have gone on to play representative rugby league while at the club and the year(s) which they achieved the honour. Representatives from the Shellharbour City Dragons are included as they are a feeder club.

International

Australia
 Shaun Timmins (1999–00, 2002–04)
 Trent Barrett (2000–02, 2005)
 Nathan Blacklock (2001)
 Mark Gasnier (2001, 2005–08)
 Jason Ryles (2001–02, 2004–05)
 Luke Bailey (2003–04)
 Matt Cooper (2004–06)
 Ben Creagh (2005,2011)
 Ben Hornby (2006)
 Darius Boyd (2009–11)
 Brett Morris (2009–14)
 Michael Weyman (2010)
 Dean Young  (2010)
 Beau Scott (2011)
 Josh Dugan (2015–16)
 Trent Merrin (2015)
 Tyson Frizell (2016–2017)
 Ben Hunt (2018–)
 Paul Vaughan (2019)

Cook Islands 
 Daniel Fepuleai (2009)
 Steven Marsters (2019)

England 
 Gareth Widdop (2014–19)
 Mike Cooper (2015)
 James Graham (2018)

Fiji 
 Eto Nabuli (2015)
 Mikaele Ravalawa (2019–)
 Korbin Sims (2019)

Great Britain 
 Gareth Widdop (2019)
 James Graham (2019)

Italy
 Paul Vaughan (2017)

Lebanon 
 Hassan Saleh (2003)

New Zealand
 Craig Smith (1999–01)
 Chase Stanley (2007)
 Jason Nightingale (2008–16)
 Nathan Fien (2009–12)
 Jeremy Smith (2009–10)
 Gerard Beale (2014)
 Russell Packer (2017)

Papua New Guinea
 Luke Page (2015)
 Nene Macdonald (2017)

Samoa
 Lagi Setu (2008)
 Kyle Stanley (2009)
 Leeson Ah Mau (2013–17)
 Daniel Vidot (2013)
 Tim Lafai (2013–)
 Luciano Leilua (2019)
 Francis Molo (2022-)
 Jaydn Su'A (2022-)
 Mathew Feagai (2022-)

Scotland
 Daniel Heckenberg (2000)
 Euan Aitken (2016)

Tonga
 Moses Suli (2022-)
 Junior Amone (2022-)

Wales
 Tyson Frizell (2013)

International 9s

Australia 

 Tyson Frizell (2019)
 Ben Hunt (2019)

Cook Islands 
 Steven Marsters (2019)

England 

  Gareth Widdop (2019)
  James Graham (2019)

Samoa 

  Tim Lafai (2019)
 Luciano Leilua (2019)

State Of Origin

New South Wales
 Anthony Mundine (1999)
 Jamie Ainscough (2000–01)
 Shaun Timmins (2000, 2002–04)
 Trent Barrett (2001–02, 2004–05)
 Jason Ryles (2002–05)
 Luke Bailey (2002–03, 2005–06)
 Mark Gasnier (2004–06, 2008)
 Matt Cooper (2004–08, 2010)
 Ben Hornby (2004, 2006, 2008)
 Brent Kite (2004)
 Ben Creagh (2009–10)
 Michael Weyman (2009–10)
 Justin Poore (2009)
 Brett Morris (2010–14)
 Beau Scott (2010–12)
 Trent Merrin (2011–15)
 Jamie Soward (2011)
 Dean Young (2011)
 Josh Dugan (2013–15)
 Tyson Frizell (2016–)
 Jack de Belin (2018)
 Paul Vaughan (2018–)
 Tariq Sims (2018–)

Queensland
 Darius Boyd (2009–11)
 Neville Costigan (2009–10)
 Ben Hunt (2018–)
 Corey Norman (2019)
 Andrew McCullough (2021-)

All Stars Game

Indigenous All Stars
 Jamie Soward (2010–11)
 Wendell Sailor (2010)
 George Rose (2015)
 Josh Kerr (2019–)
 Tyrell Fuimaono (2020-)
 Tyrell Sloan (2022-)

NRL All Stars
 Matt Cooper (2010)
 Brett Morris (2011, 2013)
 Nathan Fien (2012)
 Jason Nightingale (2012)
 Trent Merrin (2015)

Maori All Stars 

  Issac Luke (2020)

City Vs Country Origin

NSW City
 Mark Gasnier (2001, 2003)
 Lance Thompson (2001, 2003–04)
 Adam Cuthbertson (2011)
 Jake Marketo (2017)
 Cameron McInnes (2017)
 Hame Sele (2017)

NSW Country
 Nathan Blacklock (2001, 2004)
 Jason Ryles (2001, 2003, 2005)
 Luke Bailey (2002, 2005)
 Shaun Timmins (2003)
 Trent Barrett (2003, 2005)
 Matt Cooper (2003–04)
 Brent Kite (2004)
 Ben Creagh (2005–07, 2009–10)
 Ben Hornby (2005–06, 2008)
 Josh Morris (2007)
 Michael Weyman (2009)
 Justin Poore (2009)
 Jamie Soward (2009, 2011)
 Beau Scott (2009)
 Dean Young (2010)
 Dan Hunt (2011)
 Trent Merrin (2011–13)
 Matt Prior (2011)
 Brett Morris (2012)
 Mitch Rein (2014–15)
 Tyson Frizell (2015–16)
 Joel Thompson (2015)
 Euan Aitken (2016)
 Jack De Belin (2016–17)
 Tariq Sims (2017)
 Paul Vaughan (2017)

Other honours

Prime Minister's XIII
 Matt Cooper (2005)
 Luke Priddis (2005)
 Ben Creagh (2005)
 Mark Gasnier (2007)
 Josh Morris (2008)
 Dan Hunt (2012)
 Brett Morris (2013)
 Euan Aitken (2015)
 Trent Merrin (2015)
 Josh Dugan (2016–17)
 Tyson Frizell (2016–19)
 Paul Vaughan (2017)
 Zac Lomax (2018)
 Ben Hunt (2018–19)
 Reece Robson (2018)
  Zac Lomax (2022)
  Ben Hunt (2022)

Indigenous Dreamtime Team
 Jamie Soward (2008)

All Golds
 Chase Stanley (2007)

New Zealand Māori
 Chase Stanley (2008)
 Jason Nightingale (2008)
 Ben Ellis (2008)
 Rangi Chase (2008)

Representative Captains

Other honours

Prime Minister's XIII 

  Mark Gasnier (2007)
  Trent Merrin (2015)

New Zealand Māori
 Ben Ellis (2008)

Representative Coaching Staff

All Stars Game
NRL All Stars
 Wayne Bennett

References

 
Representatives
Rugby league representative players lists
Sydney-sport-related lists